Carousel is a 1967 television movie, produced as an Armstrong Circle Theatre special. It is based on the stage musical Carousel. It was produced by Norman Rosemont.

Plot 
In a Maine coastal village toward the end of the 19th century, the swaggering, carefree carnival barker, Billy Bigelow, captivates and marries the naive millworker, Julie Jordan. Billy loses his job just as he learns that Julie is pregnant and, desperately intent upon providing a decent life for his family, he is coerced into being an accomplice to a robbery.

Cast
Robert Goulet as Billy Bigelow
Mary Grover as Julie
Pernell Roberts as Jigger
Jack De Lon as Mr Snow
Charlie Ruggles as the Starkeeper
Marlyn Mason as Carrie

Production
It took producer Norman Rosemont several years to negotiate the rights. In December 1966, he announced he bought the rights from 20th Century Fox, who made the 1956 film version. Then Richard Rodgers objected, claiming Fox did not own all the rights.

It starred Robert Goulet, who had performed the role on stage over the previous two years. He had just appeared in a television production of Brigadoon (1966) for Rosemont.

The production was originally going to last for 90 minutes, but Rosemont worried that he would not be able to keep the whole score and any of the plot, and so he expanded it to two hours. Then in March 1967, the production was in the middle of rehearsals when it was picketed by the American Federation of Television and Radio Artists. However, the strike ended and taping was able to be finished by 18 April that year. Filming took place at NBC's Burbank Studios.

Reception
The Los Angeles Times called it an 'exceptional production'.

References

External links
Carousel at IMDb

American musical television films
1967 musical films
1967 films
Films based on musicals
Films directed by Paul Bogart
1960s American films
1960s English-language films